Cap Blanc or Cape Blanc, meaning "White Cape", may refer to:

 Ras Nouadhibou or Cap Blanc, a headland in Mauritania and Western Sahara
 Cap Blanc rock shelter, a prehistoric limestone shelter in France
 Cap Blanc (Ibiza), a beach on the Spanish island of Ibiza
 Cape Blanc (Quebec), a strip of land in Quebec City, Canada

See also
 Cabo Blanco (disambiguation)
 Cape Blanco (disambiguation)